The Aerocomp VM-1 Esqual is a Swedish ultralight aircraft, produced by Arsi AB (formerly Aerocomp AB) of Alingsås. The aircraft is supplied as a kit for amateur construction or as a complete ready-to-fly-aircraft.

Design and development
The aircraft was originally designed in Spain by Vol Mediterrani to comply with the Fédération Aéronautique Internationale microlight rules and production was later moved to Sweden. It features a cantilever low-wing, a two-seats-in-side-by-side configuration enclosed cockpit, tricycle landing gear or conventional landing gear and a single engine in tractor configuration. Early versions used conventional landing gear but the current manufacturer is producing the nosewheel version. A retractable gear version is under development.

The aircraft is made from high density PVC foam and epoxy resin composites. Standard engines available are the  Rotax 912S,  Jabiru 2200,  Jabiru 3300 and the  ULPower UL260i four-stroke powerplants. The landing gear is made from 7175-T6 aluminum alloy and employs a freely-castering nosewheel and main wheels brakes for steering. The wing features electrically-actuated flaps. Manual trim is standard with electric trim optional.

Specifications (VM-1 Esqual)

See also

References

External links

2000s Swedish ultralight aircraft
Homebuilt aircraft
Single-engined tractor aircraft